َArdestani Expressway is an expressway in northeastern Isfahan, Iran connecting to Isfahan International Airport via Qahjavarestan.

Route

Streets in Isfahan
Transportation in Isfahan Province